Crossotus klugi is a species of beetle in the family Cerambycidae. It was described by William Lucas Distant in 1892. It is known from Botswana, South Africa, Namibia, Mozambique, and Zimbabwe.

References

klugi
Beetles described in 1892